Mazibaleh-ye Sofla (also Romanized as Mazībaleh-ye Soflá; also known as Mezeybleh-ye Soflá) is a village in Azadeh Rural District, Moshrageh District, Ramshir County, Khuzestan Province, Iran. At the 2006 census, its population was 112, in 18 families.

References 

Populated places in Ramshir County